Love Sick or Lovesick may refer to:
Lovesickness, a non-medical, popular description of intense changes in behavior associated with falling in love

Film and television

Film
Lovesick (1937 film), an Oswald the Lucky Rabbit cartoon
Lovesick (1983 film), an American romantic comedy film
Love Sick (film), a 2006 Romanian drama film
Lovesick (2014 film), an American comedy film
Lovesick (2016 film), a Canadian romantic comedy film

Television
 Lovesick (TV series), a 2014–2018 British sitcom
 Love Sick: The Series, a 2014–2015 Thai LGBT drama
 "Love Sick" (Grimm), a television episode
 "Lovesick" (Space Ghost Coast to Coast), a television episode

Music

Albums
The Lovesick, by Jason Reeves, 2011
Love Sick (album), an album by Don Toliver
Lovesick, an EP, or the title song, by Grand Duchy, 2009

Songs
"Love Sick" (Bob Dylan song), 1998
"Lovesick" (EliZe song), 2008
"Lovesick" (Emily Osment song), 2011
"Lovesick" (Mura Masa song), 2016
"Lovesick" (Priscilla Renea song), 2010
"Lovesick" / "Mirrors", by the Getaway Plan, 2013
"Love Sick", by Trippie Redd from A Love Letter to You 4, 2019
"Lovesick", by Banks from The Altar, 2016
"Lovesick", by Beverly McClellan, 2011
"Lovesick", by Elton John from A Single Man, 1978
"Lovesick", by Gang Starr from Step in the Arena, 1991
"Lovesick", by Hans-Peter Lindstrøm and Christabelle from Real Life Is No Cool, 2010
"Lovesick", by Jacob Whitesides, 2016
"Lovesick", by Maroon 5 from Jordi, 2021
"Lovesick", by TLC from FanMail, 1999

Other uses
Love Sick (novel), a 2005 young-adult novel by Jake Coburn
LoveSick, a playing mode in the upcoming video game Yandere Simulator

See also
 "Luv Sick", a song by Ratt from Ratt, 1999